The 2002 NASCAR Busch Series began February 16 and ended November 16. Greg Biffle of Roush Racing was crowned champion.

Teams and drivers

Complete schedule

Limited Schedule

Races

EAS/GNC Live Well 300 

The EAS/GNC Live Well 300 was held February 16 at Daytona International Speedway. Joe Nemechek won the pole.

Top ten results

3-Dale Earnhardt Jr.
99-Michael Waltrip
17-Matt Kenseth
57-Jason Keller
47-Shane Hmiel
10-Scott Riggs
24-Jack Sprague
71-Kevin Lepage
92-Andy Houston
48-Kenny Wallace

Failed to qualify: Dan Pardus (No. 32), Mike Wallace (No. 4), C. W. Smith (No. 67), Mike Harmon (No. 44), David Boggs (No. 22)

 Dale Earnhardt Jr.'s number 3 car marked the first race for the 3 car since the tragic 2001 Daytona 500. Junior would also run the 3 car at Charlotte later that year.

1-866RBCTerm.com 200 

The 1-866RBCTerm.com 200 was held February 23 at North Carolina Speedway. Jeff Green won the pole.

Top ten results

57-Jason Keller
60-Greg Biffle
7-Randy LaJoie
10-Scott Riggs
18-Mike McLaughlin
24-Jack Sprague
1-Jimmy Spencer
46-Ashton Lewis
33-Tony Raines
14-Larry Foyt

Failed to qualify: Cam Strader (No. 84), Lance Hooper (No. 89)

Sam's Town 300 

The Sam's Town 300 was held March 2 at Las Vegas Motor Speedway. Jeff Burton won the pole.

Top ten results

9-Jeff Burton
99-Michael Waltrip
2-Johnny Sauter
71-Kevin Lepage
21-Jeff Green
24-Jack Sprague
7-Randy LaJoie
48-Kenny Wallace
60-Greg Biffle
59-Stacy Compton

Failed to qualify: Jeff Fuller (No. 88), Mike McLaughlin (No. 34), A. J. Alsup (No. 72), Mike Harmon (No. 44), Dion Ciccarelli (No. 84)

darlingtonraceway.com 200 

The darlingtonraceway.com 200 was held March 16 at Darlington Raceway. Jeff Burton won the pole.

Top ten results

9-Jeff Burton
60-Greg Biffle
21-Jeff Green
57-Jason Keller
48-Kenny Wallace
18-Mike McLaughlin
33-Tony Raines
92-Todd Bodine
24-Jack Sprague
59-Stacy Compton

Failed to qualify: Phil Bonifield (No. 90), Shane Hall (No. 84)

Channellock 250 

The Channellock 250 was held March 23 at Bristol Motor Speedway. Scott Riggs won the pole. This race was known for several major story lines. There were two separate altercations post-race, the most notable being a physical confrontation between Kevin Harvick and Greg Biffle following an incident between the two drivers on lap 241 in which Harvick crashed hard.  The other happening just on the other end of pit road in a verbal confrontation between Jimmy Spencer and Jack Sprague after Spencer turned Sprague, who was five laps down, in the last turn on the last lap while chasing down Jeff Green for the win. Green would ultimately win while Spencer lost two spots in that incident to drop to fourth. It was also known for privateer driver Ken Alexander and rookie Johnny Sauter causing or getting caught up in multiple incidents with Alexander being a nuisance on the track throughout the race, both finally dropping out before the race's end as well as a hard crash on the last lap between Mark Green and Larry Foyt with Green suffering a broken left foot.

Top ten results

21-Jeff Green
18-Mike McLaughlin
23-Scott Wimmer
1-Jimmy Spencer
60-Greg Biffle
48-Kenny Wallace
7-Randy LaJoie
92-Todd Bodine
10-Scott Riggs
47-Shane Hmiel

Failed to qualify: none

O'Reilly 300 

The O'Reilly 300 was held April 6 at Texas Motor Speedway. Jeff Green won the pole. The race ended after 116 laps due to rain. Michael Waltrip flipped over on lap 45. He was uninjured.

Top ten results

37-Jeff Purvis
24-Jack Sprague
87-Joe Nemechek
10-Scott Riggs
21-Jeff Green
29-Kevin Harvick
7-Randy LaJoie
25-Bobby Hamilton Jr.
17-Matt Kenseth
9-Jeff Burton

Failed to qualify: Dan Pardus (No. 32), Mike Harmon (No. 44), Jason Schuler (No. 73), Dwayne Leik (No. 81)

 This was Jeff Purvis' final career win before his hard crash at Nazareth.

Pepsi 300 presented by Kroger 

The Pepsi 300 presented by Kroger was held April 13 at Nashville Superspeedway. Shane Hmiel won the pole.

Top ten results

10-Scott Riggs
24-Jack Sprague
25-Bobby Hamilton Jr.
23-Scott Wimmer
57-Jason Keller
7-Randy LaJoie
27-Jamie McMurray
12-Kerry Earnhardt
59-Stacy Compton
19-Tim Sauter

Failed to qualify: none

Aaron's 312 at Talladega 

The Aaron's 312 at Talladega was held April 20 at Talladega Superspeedway. Johnny Sauter won the pole. The race was most remembered for "the Big One" on lap 15 which was the largest crash in series history, which involved about 30 cars. This occurred when Shane Hmiel got into Scott Riggs and he hit Johnny Sauter. Sauter tumbled end over end while cars trying to avoid the wreck braked and slammed into each other. Only three cars finished on the lead lap.

Top ten results

57-Jason Keller
59-Stacy Compton
07-Tim Fedewa
92-Todd Bodine
66-Casey Mears
49-Andy Kirby
77-Jimmy Kitchens
14-Larry Foyt
48-Kenny Wallace
36-Hank Parker Jr.

Failed to qualify: Rick Markle (No. 96)

Auto Club 300 

The Auto Club 300 was held April 27 at California Speedway. Jack Sprague won the pole.

Top ten results

10-Scott Riggs
21-Jeff Green
59-Stacy Compton
24-Jack Sprague
57-Jason Keller
18-Mike McLaughlin
19-Tim Sauter
99-Michael Waltrip
7-Randy LaJoie
60-Greg Biffle

Failed to qualify: Jack Sellers (No. 15)

Hardee's 250 

The Hardee's 250 was held May 3 at Richmond International Raceway. Jack Sprague won the pole.

Top ten results

57-Jason Keller
46-Ashton Lewis
60-Greg Biffle
99-Michael Waltrip
54-Kevin Grubb
36-Hank Parker Jr.
40-Brian Vickers
23-Scott Wimmer
27-Jamie McMurray
19-Tim Sauter

 Johnny Benson crashed hard in turn 3 early in the race. He suffered broken ribs, causing him to miss 3 Winston Cup races.

Busch 200 

The Busch 200 was held May 11 at New Hampshire International Speedway. Shane Hmiel won the pole.

Top ten results

25-Bobby Hamilton Jr.
92-Todd Bodine
24-Jack Sprague
47-Shane Hmiel
18-Mike McLaughlin
7-Randy LaJoie
10-Scott Riggs
36-Hank Parker Jr.
27-Jamie McMurray
54-Kevin Grubb

Failed to qualify: none

Stacker 2 200 

The Stacker 2 200 was held May 18 at Nazareth Speedway. Jack Sprague won the pole. The race is known for a severe crash by Jeff Purvis, who blew his engine, spun out, & was slammed into by Greg Biffle, causing severe head trauma. Purvis has never fully recovered from the injuries he suffered, although he would return to drive a NASCAR stock car two years later at the final Busch race at Nazareth.

Top ten results

57-Jason Keller
10-Scott Riggs
5-Ron Hornaday Jr.
27-Jamie McMurray
7-Randy LaJoie
25-Bobby Hamilton Jr.
21-Jay Sauter
46-Ashton Lewis
18-Mike McLaughlin
33-Tony Raines

Failed to qualify: none

Carquest Auto Parts 300 

The Carquest Auto Parts 300 was held May 25 at Lowe's Motor Speedway. Ron Hornaday Jr. won the pole.

Top ten results

21-Jeff Green
60-Greg Biffle
10-Scott Riggs
18-Mike McLaughlin
92-Todd Bodine
37-Kevin Lepage
25-Bobby Hamilton Jr.
54-Kevin Grubb
2-Jay Sauter
24-Jack Sprague

Failed to qualify: Christian Fittipaldi (No. 30), Carl Long (No. 64), Stanton Barrett (No. 91), Larry Gunselman (No. 84), Phil Bonifield (No. 90)

MBNA Platinum 200 

The MBNA Platinum 200 was held June 1 at Dover International Speedway. Jeff Green won the pole.

Top ten results

60-Greg Biffle
21-Jeff Green
25-Bobby Hamilton Jr.
23-Scott Wimmer
24-Jack Sprague
5-Ron Hornaday Jr.
48-Kenny Wallace
18-Mike McLaughlin
7-Randy LaJoie
54-Kevin Grubb

Failed to qualify: none

Inside Traxx 300 presented by Met-Rx 

The Inside Traxx 300 presented by Met-Rx was held June 8 at Nashville Superspeedway. Greg Biffle won the pole.

Top ten results

24-Jack Sprague
25-Bobby Hamilton Jr.
60-Greg Biffle
21-Jay Sauter
57-Jason Keller
48-Kenny Wallace
23-Scott Wimmer
36-Hank Parker Jr.
47-Shane Hmiel
66-Casey Mears

Kroger 300 presented by Oreo 

The Kroger 300 presented by Oreo was held June 15 but finished on June 16 at Kentucky Speedway due to rain. Scott Riggs won the pole. The race was delayed a day by rain, but the broadcast of the race was aired on tape delay because of a NASCAR rule prohibiting two national series from being broadcast simultaneously.

Top ten results

92-Todd Bodine
60-Greg Biffle
33-Tony Raines
10-Scott Riggs
23-Scott Wimmer
27-Jamie McMurray
12-Kerry Earnhardt
5-Ricky Hendrick
48-Kenny Wallace
63-Shane Hall

Failed to qualify: Chad Chaffin (No. 16), Brad Baker (No. 96), Dwayne Leik (No. 81), Jeff Fultz (No. 86), Dion Ciccarelli (No. 84), Brian Weber (No. 84), Jason Schuler (No. 73)

GNC Live Well 250 

The GNC Live Well 250 was held June 30 at The Milwaukee Mile. Greg Biffle won the pole.

Top ten results

60-Greg Biffle
57-Jason Keller
23-Scott Wimmer
26-Ron Hornaday Jr.
33-Tony Raines
63-Shane Hmiel
25-Bobby Hamilton Jr.
18-Mike McLaughlin
19-Tim Sauter
7-Randy LaJoie

Failed to qualify: Brian Ross (No. 62)

Stacker 2/GNC Live Well 250 

The Stacker 2/GNC Live Well 250 was held July 5 at Daytona International Speedway. Joe Nemechek won the pole.

Top ten results

87-Joe Nemechek
60-Greg Biffle
37-Kevin Lepage
57-Jason Keller
27-Jamie McMurray
2-Johnny Sauter
18-Mike McLaughlin
1-Jimmy Spencer
54-Kevin Grubb
59-Stacy Compton

Failed to qualify: none

Tropicana Twister 300 

The Tropicana Twister 300 was held July 13 at Chicagoland Speedway. Todd Bodine won the pole while Christian Elder and Dan Pardus suffered hard crashes during qualifying. Elder sustained concussion and a broken collarbone, which effectively ended his racing career while Pardus escaped his crash uninjured.

Top ten results

2-Johnny Sauter
92-Todd Bodine
9-Jeff Burton
87-Joe Nemechek
26-Ron Hornaday Jr.
1-Jimmy Spencer
21-Jeff Green
60-Greg Biffle
25-Bobby Hamilton Jr.
57-Jason Keller

Failed to qualify: Richard Mitchell (No. 56), Steadman Marlin (No. 95), Larry Hollenbeck (No. 22), Jason Schuler (No. 73), Dan Pardus (No. 32)

Charter Pipeline 250 

The Charter Pipeline 250 was held July 20 at Gateway International Raceway. Randy LaJoie won the pole. The week was marked by tragedy as Andy Kirby was killed in a motorcycle accident on July 18.

Top ten results

60-Greg Biffle
26-Ron Hornaday Jr.
54-Kevin Grubb
24-Jack Sprague
33-Tony Raines
57-Jason Keller
18-Mike McLaughlin
27-Jamie McMurray
37-Kevin Lepage
19-Tim Sauter

Failed to qualify: Kertus Davis (No. 0), Drew White (No. 22)

Future Busch Series champion and Cup superstar Carl Edwards made his debut in the #9 Chevy for Bost Motorsports. Edwards exited on lap 35 with valve issues and wound up 38th in the field of 43.

NetZero 250 

The NetZero 250 was held July 27 at Pikes Peak International Raceway. Jason Keller won the pole.

Top ten results

36-Hank Parker Jr.
60-Greg Biffle
57-Jason Keller
26-Ron Hornaday Jr.
54-Kevin Lepage
23-Scott Wimmer
18-Mike McLaughlin
27-Jamie McMurray
46-Ashton Lewis
59-Stacy Compton

Failed to qualify: none

Kroger 200 

The Kroger 200 was held August 3 at Indianapolis Raceway Park. Greg Biffle won the pole.

Top ten results

60-Greg Biffle
57-Jason Keller
23-Scott Wimmer
2-Johnny Sauter
22-Kenny Wallace
9-Jon Wood
5-Ricky Hendrick
27-Jamie McMurray
33-Tony Raines
26-Ron Hornaday Jr.

Failed to qualify: none

Cabela's 250 

The Cabela's 250 was held August 17 at Michigan International Speedway. Kevin Lepage won the pole.

Top ten results

99-Michael Waltrip
9-Jeff Burton
21-Jeff Green
92-Todd Bodine
25-Bobby Hamilton Jr.
10-Scott Riggs
23-Scott Wimmer
59-Stacy Compton
1-Jimmy Spencer
98-Kasey Kahne

Failed to qualify: Richard Mitchell (No. 56), Michael Vergers (No. 07), Keith Murt (No. 79), Mike Harmon (No. 44), Rick Markle (No. 84), Steadman Marlin (No. 95), Brian Ross (No. 62), Jason Schuler (No. 73), Wayman Wittman (No. 93)

Food City 250 

The Food City 250 was held August 23 at Bristol Motor Speedway. Jason Keller won the pole.

Top ten results

1-Jimmy Spencer
23-Scott Wimmer
60-Greg Biffle
18-Mike McLaughlin
21-Jeff Green
48-Kenny Wallace
99-Michael Waltrip
33-Tony Raines
57-Jason Keller
7-Randy LaJoie

Failed to qualify: Ron Young (No. 71), Josh Richeson (No. 11), Kasey Kahne (No. 98), Tim Bainey (No. 15), Joe Buford (No. 84), Butch Jarvis (No. 53)

Gatorade 200 

The Gatorade 200 was held August 31 at Darlington Raceway. Greg Biffle won the pole. The race was shortened to 74 laps due to rain.

Top ten results

9-Jeff Burton
57-Jason Keller
21-Jeff Green
60-Greg Biffle
24-Jack Sprague
25-Bobby Hamilton Jr.
23-Scott Wimmer
18-Mike McLaughlin
33-Tony Raines
10-Scott Riggs

Failed to qualify: Gus Wasson (No. 96), Ron Young (No. 71)

Funai 250 

The Funai 250 was held September 6 at Richmond International Raceway. Dale Earnhardt Jr. won the pole. This race was marred by several large accidents, the hardest involved Derrike Cope, whose car suffered a stuck throttle, and slammed the turn 1 wall with such force that the A pillar snapped and the roof was partially ripped off. Cope suffered minor injuries.

Top ten results

8-Dale Earnhardt Jr.
27-Jamie McMurray
9-Jeff Burton
33-Tony Raines
57-Jason Keller
60-Greg Biffle
36-Hank Parker Jr.
99-Michael Waltrip
23-Scott Wimmer
48-Kenny Wallace

Failed to qualify: Michael Vergers (No. 07), Brian Vickers (No. 40), Martin Truex Jr. (No. 56), Shayne Lockhart (No. 22), Dion Ciccarelli (No. 84), Chris Fontaine (No. 41), Ron Young (No. 71), Josh Richeson (No. 11), Mike Harmon (No. 44), Dan Pardus (No. 32)

MBNA All-American Heroes 200 

The MBNA All-American Heroes 200 was held September 21 at Dover International Speedway. Kevin Lepage won the pole.

Top ten results

23-Scott Wimmer
18-Mike McLaughlin
24-Jack Sprague
21-Jeff Green
57-Jason Keller
1-Jimmy Spencer
7-Randy LaJoie
19-Tim Sauter
48-Kenny Wallace
47-Shane Hmiel

Failed to qualify: Chris Fontaine (No. 41), Bill Hoff (No. 93), Richard Mitchell (No. 56), Donnie Neuenberger (No. 52)
This was Wimmer's first career NASCAR Busch Series victory.

Mr. Goodcents 300 

The Mr. Goodcents 300 was held September 28 at Kansas Speedway. Michael Waltrip won the pole.

Top ten results

9-Jeff Burton
12-Kerry Earnhardt
87-Joe Nemechek
60-Greg Biffle
33-Tony Raines
1-Jimmy Spencer
21-Jeff Green
25-Bobby Hamilton Jr.
15-Lyndon Amick
27-Jamie McMurray

Failed to qualify: Mike Wallace (No. 4), Jason Schuler (No. 73), Steadman Marlin (No. 95), Ryck Sanders (No. 52)

Little Trees 300 

The Little Trees 300 was held October 12 at Lowe's Motor Speedway. Michael Waltrip won the pole. The top three finishers were the only cars to finish on the lead lap.

Top ten results

9-Jeff Burton
99-Michael Waltrip
87-Joe Nemechek
21-Jeff Green
5-David Green
60-Greg Biffle
6-Wally Dallenbach Jr.
18-Mike McLaughlin
25-Bobby Hamilton Jr.
47-Shane Hmiel

Failed to qualify: Justin Labonte (No. 04), Brad Baker (No. 28), Jeff Fultz (No. 86), Jason White (No. 95), Carl Long (No. 22), Chad Chaffin (No. 16), John Hayden (No. 85), Larry Gunselman (No. 94), Brian Vickers (No. 84), Mike Harmon (No. 44), Cam Strader (No. 52)

Sam's Town 250 Benefitting St. Jude 

The Sam's Town 250 Benefitting St. Jude was held October 20 at Memphis Motorsports Park. Greg Biffle won the pole. The race was scheduled for October 19, but was postponed a day for rain, and was broadcast on tape delay due to a conflict with the Old Dominion 500.

Top ten results

23-Scott Wimmer
59-Stacy Compton
27-Jamie McMurray
36-Hank Parker Jr.
12-Kerry Earnhardt
19-Tim Sauter
26-Ron Hornaday Jr.
21-Jay Sauter
5-David Green
57-Jason Keller

Failed to qualify: Jason Schuler (No. 73), Bryan Reffner (No. 70), John Hayden (No. 85), Tim Bainey (No. 15), Mike Harmon (No. 44), Chris Fontaine (No. 41), Jody Lavender (No. 84), Chad Chaffin (No. 16), Michael Dokken (No. 55), Dan Pardus (No. 32), Justin Ashburn (No. 61), Butch Jarvis (No. 53)

Aaron's 312 

The Aaron's 312 was held October 26 at Atlanta Motor Speedway. Greg Biffle won the pole.

Top ten results

27-Jamie McMurray
99-Michael Waltrip
18-Mike McLaughlin
10-Scott Riggs
60-Greg Biffle
87-Joe Nemechek
57-Jason Keller
25-Bobby Hamilton Jr.
46-Ashton Lewis
2-Johnny Sauter

Failed to qualify: David Reutimann (No. 88), Roberto Guerrero (No. 09), Lyndon Amick (No. 15), Hermie Sadler (No. 43), Justin Labonte (No. 04), Keith Murt (No. 79)

Sam's Club 200 

The Sam's Club 200 was held November 2 at North Carolina Speedway. Jeff Green won the pole.

Top ten results

27-Jamie McMurray
60-Greg Biffle
7-Randy LaJoie
5-David Green
59-Stacy Compton
21-Jeff Green
99-Michael Waltrip
63-Shane Hmiel
48-Kenny Wallace
24-Jack Sprague

Failed to qualify: Justin Labonte (No. 04), Cam Strader (No. 52), Jeff Fultz (No. 86), Dan Pardus (No. 32), C. W. Smith (No. 67), Jody Lavender (No. 08), Clay Dale (No. 09), Brad Baker (No. 28)

Bashas' Supermarkets 200 

The Bashas' Supermarkets 200 was held November 9 at Phoenix International Raceway. Greg Biffle won the pole.

Top ten results

23-Scott Wimmer
59-Stacy Compton
60-Greg Biffle
57-Jason Keller
5-David Green
1-Jimmy Spencer
2-Johnny Sauter
46-Ashton Lewis
6-Wally Dallenbach Jr.
12-Kerry Earnhardt

Failed to qualify: Jay Sauter (No. 02), Jimmy Kitchens (No. 72)

Ford 300 

The Ford 300 was held November 16 at Homestead-Miami Speedway. Jeff Green won the pole.

Top ten results

23-Scott Wimmer
36-Hank Parker Jr.
87-Joe Nemechek
60-Greg Biffle
25-Bobby Hamilton Jr.
7-Randy LaJoie
99-Michael Waltrip
1-Jimmy Spencer
46-Ashton Lewis
21-Jeff Green

Failed to qualify: Geoff Bodine (No. 51), Kertus Davis (No. 0), Stanton Barrett (No. 91), Bryan Reffner (No. 07), Mike Wallace (No. 4), Carlos Contreras (No. 09), Cam Strader (No. 52), Mike Harmon (No. 44), Larry Gunselman (No. 94), Dwayne Leik (No. 81), Jimmy Kitchens (No. 84)

Final points standings 

Greg Biffle - 4924
Jason Keller - 4644
Scott Wimmer - 4488
Mike McLaughlin - 4253
Jack Sprague - 4206
Jamie McMurray - 4147
Kenny Wallace - 4078
Bobby Hamilton Jr. - 4058
Stacy Compton - 4042
Scott Riggs -  4023
Randy LaJoie - 4021
Tony Raines - 3804
Tim Sauter - 3644
Hank Parker Jr. - 3540
Johnny Sauter - 3538
Shane Hmiel - 3416
Ashton Lewis - 3279
Ron Hornaday Jr. - 3268
Jeff Green - 3209
Larry Foyt - 3158
Casey Mears - 3148
Kerry Earnhardt - 3145
Todd Bodine - 3071
Kevin Grubb - 2885
Kevin Lepage - 2594
Jimmy Spencer - 2454
Michael Waltrip - 2397
Ricky Hendrick - 2125
Shane Hall - 1971
Brian Vickers - 1914
Jeff Burton - 1902
Mark Green - 1896
Kasey Kahne - 1887
Joe Nemechek - 1773
Chad Chaffin - 1643
Jay Sauter - 1525
Mike Wallace - 1506
Mike Harmon - 1321
Jeff Purvis - 1309
David Green - 1257
Larry Gunselman - 1094
Brad Teague - 1066
Jimmy Kitchens - 981
Lyndon Amick - 960
Ron Young - 945
Stanton Barrett - 908
Butch Miller - 907
Andy Kirby - 818
Dan Pardus - 780
Brian Weber - 714

Full Drivers' Championship

(key) Bold – Pole position awarded by time. Italics – Pole position set by owner's points. * – Most laps led. ** - All laps led.

NASCAR Rookie of the Year 
Scott Riggs of ppc Racing took home the 2002 Rookie of the Year title, winning twice and finishing tenth in points. Johnny Sauter won at Chicagoland Speedway and finished 14th in points despite skipping the Carquest Auto Parts 300. Shane Hmiel and Casey Mears finished 16th and 21st respectively in their NASCAR debuts, while Kerry Earnhardt had two top-fives in his second bid for top rookie honors. Brian Vickers, Kasey Kahne, and Dan Pardus ran limited schedules during their rookie campaigns.

See also 
 2002 NASCAR Winston Cup Series
 2002 NASCAR Craftsman Truck Series

References

External links 
Busch Series Standings and Statistics for 2002

NASCAR Xfinity Series seasons